Otteita Tuomari Nurmion laulukirjasta is a tribute album by Sielun Veljet to Tuomari Nurmio, recorded in 1990 but only released in 2007. It is the only Sielun Veljet recording to top the Finnish album charts.

Sielun Veljet had already released several Tuomari Nurmio covers. Their first album, Sielun Veljet, contains "Huda huda" and Musta laatikko has five songs credited to Nurmio. Alf Forsman had even played in Nurmio's band before joining Sielun Veljet. Ismo Alanko has said that he sees Nurmio as "the absolute number one of Finnish songwriters, especially as a lyricist".

Three recorded songs were destroyed when the original tape was magnetized, including "Lasten mehuhetki", one of Nurmio's most popular songs.

Track listing
Music and lyrics by Tuomari Nurmio.
 "Älä itke Iines"—3:10
 "Oi mutsi mutsi"—3:25
 "Rion satamassa"—2:48
 "Viiniä! Malja marttyyreille"—2:59
 "Sunnuntaina"—2:42
 "Liputtomat laivat"—3:26
 "Hyvästi kotimaa"—2:36
 "Oi mahtava totemi"—3:24
 "Moskovan maailmanrodeo 2070"—2:11
 "Maailmanpyörä palaa!"—2:00
 "Kurja matkamies maan"—2:36
 "Kulkuri ja maamies"—2:41
 "Hunajainen paholainen"—2:23
 "Huda huda"—3:07

Personnel
 Ismo Alanko -- vocals, guitar, bass
 Jukka Orma—guitar, organ, bass, vocals
 Jouko Hohko—bass, vocals
 Alf Forsman -- drums, percussion

Notes

2007 albums
Tribute albums
Sielun Veljet albums